Paul Héger (1846–1925) was a Belgian biologist, and was born to Constantin Héger and Claire Zoë Parent.

Paul Hèger assisted Earnest Solvay (famous for Solvay Process) along with Hendrik Lorentz (Dutch physicist who shared noble with Pieter Zeeman for Zeeman effect) in the formation of Solvay enterprise who arrange Solvay conferences.

Hèger was professor at Universitè Libre de Bruxelles and a close collaborator of Ernest Solvay. He wrote in 1912 the rules of institute of Physics with Dutch physicist Hendrick Lorentz 1902 Nobel Laureate. 

1846 births
1925 deaths
Belgian biologists
Scientists from Brussels